Altin is a given Albanian name. Notable people with the name include:

 Altin Bytyçi (born 2001), Kosovan footballer
 Altin Çuko (born 1974), Albanian former footballer
 Altin Haxhi (born 1975), Albanian former footballer
 Altin Hoxha (born 1990), Albanian footballer
 Altin Grbović (born 1986), Serbian former footballer
 Altin Kaftira (born 1972), Albanian former danseur
 Altin Kryeziu (born 2002), Kosovan footballer
 Altin Lala (born 1975), Albanian former footballer
 Altin Rraklli (born 1970), Albanian former footballer
 Altin Rrica (born 1973), Albanian former footballer
 Altin Sufa (born 1988), Albanian cyclist
 Altin Zeqiri (born 2000), Kosovan footballer

See also

 Altın

Albanian masculine given names